The Covington House (also known as the Schendel House) is a historic house located in Tallahassee, Florida.

Description and history 
Built in 1927, it was designed by architect William Augustus Edwards. On September 7, 1989, it was added to the National Register of Historic Places.

References

External links 

 Leon County listings at National Register of Historic Places
 Leon County listings at Florida's Office of Cultural and Historical Programs
 Laurel L. Schendel Genealogy Page. at The Schendel Family Genealogy Website by Tristan Schedel
 Schendel house on NRHP at NRHP Authorities

Houses on the National Register of Historic Places in Florida
National Register of Historic Places in Tallahassee, Florida
Houses in Tallahassee, Florida
William Augustus Edwards buildings
Houses completed in 1927
1927 establishments in Florida